The longcomb sawfish, narrowsnout sawfish or green sawfish (Pristis zijsron) is a species of sawfish in the family Pristidae, found in tropical and subtropical waters of the Indo-West Pacific. It has declined drastically and is now considered a critically endangered species.

Description

Its upperparts are greenish-brown to olive, while the underparts are whitish.

A combination of characters are necessary to distinguish it from the other sawfish species: the longcomb sawfish has teeth to near the base of the rostrum or "saw" (unlike the knifetooth sawfish, Anoxypristis cuspidata), 23–37 teeth on each side of the rostrum (18–24 in the dwarf sawfish, P. clavata, 20–32 in smalltooth sawfish, P. pectinata, and 14–24 in largetooth sawfish, P. pristis), the teeth towards the tip of the rostrum are clearly closer to each other than those at its base (unlike the dwarf, smalltooth and largetooth sawfish where either equally spaced or only marginally closer to each other towards the tip of the rostrum), a relatively narrow rostrum, width equalling 9–17% of its length (typically wider in dwarf and largetooth sawfish), a rostrum that is 23–33% of the total length of the fish (20–25% in dwarf sawfish), relatively short pectoral fins (unlike the knifetooth and largetooth sawfish), a leading edge of the dorsal fin that is located clearly behind the leading edge of the pelvic fins (in front of in largetooth sawfish and roughly above in smalltooth sawfish) and it has a very small or no lower tail lobe (present in knifetooth and largetooth sawfish). It can be further separated from the two most similar species, the dwarf and smalltooth sawfish, by the considerably smaller maximum size of the former species, and the less greenish colour (when alive/recently dead) and essentially Atlantic distribution of the latter species. The smalltooth and longcomb sawfish might historically have come into contact in South Africa, but sawfish appear to have been extirpated from this country.

Distribution and habitat

The longcomb sawfish is native to tropical and subtropical waters in the western and central Indo-Pacific. Historically its distribution covered almost  and it ranged from South Africa, north to the Red Sea and Persian Gulf, east to the South China Sea, through Southeast Asia to Australia. In Australia, it ranged from Shark Bay, along the northern part of the country, and south to Jervis Bay on the eastern coast. Today it has disappeared from much of its historical range. It can live in colder waters than its relatives, as also evidenced by the range in Australia where it occurs further south than the other species of sawfish.

There are records from rivers far inland, but it is not frequent in freshwater. It is mainly found in places with a bottom consisting of sand, mud or silt.

Behavior and life cycle
The longcomb sawfish feeds on fish, crustaceans and molluscs. It thrashes its rostrum from side-to-side to dislodge prey from the seabed and to stun groups of fish. All sawfish are harmless to humans, except when captured where they can cause serious injuries when defending themselves with their "saw".

It is often said that there are about 12 young in each litter, but the basis for this number is unclear (in other sawfish species litter size ranges from 1 to 20). The females give birth in inshore areas, and the young stay near the coast and in estuaries in the first part of their lives. The maximum age is unknown, but it might be in excess of 50 years, and an individual caught as a juvenile lived for 35 years at an aquarium.

Conservation

The longcomb sawfish has declined drastically and is listed by the IUCN as "Critically Endangered" in its Red List of Threatened Species. The fins (for shark fin soup) and saw (as novelty items) are highly valuable, while some parts are used in Asian traditional medicine and the meat is eaten. Fishing is the main threat, but it is also threatened by habitat loss. Because of the potential threat they (or rather their "saw") represent to humans, they are sometimes killed before being brought onto the boat when accidentally caught. Because of the "saw", all sawfish are particularly prone to becoming entangled in fishing nets.

Historically the longcomb sawfish has been recorded in 37 countries, but it has been extirpated from 2 and possibly extirpated from another 24, leaving only 11 countries where it certainly still survives. In terms of area this means that it certainly survives in only 62% of its historical range. The total population is believed to have declined by more than 80% over three generations. The subpopulations in Australia are among the few that remain viable, but even they have declined, and the species no longer occurs in New South Wales. It receives a level of protection in Australia, Bahrain, Bangladesh, India, Indonesia, Malaysia, Qatar, South Africa (where already extirpated) and the United Arab Emirates, but enforcement of fishing regulations are often lacking. All sawfish species are listed on CITES Appendix I, which restricts international trade.

Longcomb sawfish have few natural enemies, but can fall prey to large sharks and crocodiles.

Small numbers are kept in public aquariums, with studbooks listing 13 individuals (7 males, 6 females) in North America in 2014, 6 individuals (3 males, 3 females) in Europe in 2013, and 2 individuals in Japan in 2017.

See also

 Threatened rays

Notes

References

External links

 Shark-references.com: Species Description of Pristis zijsron (Longcomb sawfish)

longcomb sawfish
Fish of the Red Sea
Marine fish of Africa
Marine fish of Asia
Fish of South Asia
Fish of Southeast Asia
Fish of Papua New Guinea
Ovoviviparous fish
Critically endangered fish
Critically endangered fauna of Africa
Critically endangered fauna of Asia
Critically endangered fauna of Oceania
longcomb sawfish
Critically endangered fauna of China